State Route 237 (SR 237) is a  state highway located entirely within the city limits of Atlanta in the U.S. state of Georgia. Its path is entirely within Fulton County.

Route description
SR 237 begins just south of SR 13 (Buford Highway) in Midtown Atlanta, where the road continues to the south as Piedmont Road. It immediately crosses under, but does not intersect Buford Highway. Then, it passes under Interstate 85 (I-85). SR 237's northbound lanes do not have an interchange with I-85. Its southbound lanes have an interchange with I-85 south.  However, access to I-85 north is provided via an interchange with Piedmont Road NE, south of SR 237's southern terminus. North of I-85, the road crosses over a CSX Transportation rail line. It heads north and northwest to SR 141 (Peachtree Road SW). The highway heads northwest to meet its northern terminus, an intersection with US 19/SR 9 (Roswell Road) in North Buckhead. SR 237 is known as Piedmont Road NE for its entire length.

No section of SR 237 is part of the National Highway System, a system of routes determined to be the most important for the nation's economy, mobility and defense.

History
SR 237 was established at the latest by 1946 along an alignment that started at US 23, which traveled on Cheshire Bridge Road and a southern continuation of Piedmont Road NE at that time. This is just south of the current southern terminus. SR 237 headed north along Piedmont Road NE as it does today. In 1967, US 23 was moved farther to the east. However, it is not clear whether the portion of SR 237 between the former US 23 segment and its current southern terminus was decommissioned at this time.

Major intersections

See also
 
 
 Transportation in Atlanta

References

External links

237
Transportation in Fulton County, Georgia
Roads in Atlanta
Midtown Atlanta